Thailand virus (THAIV) is a single-stranded, enveloped, negative-sense RNA orthohantavirus.

Natural reservoir 
THAIV was first isolated from rodents in two Thai provinces, Nakhon Pathom Province and Nakhon Ratchasima Province, in 1994. The greater bandicoot rat (Bandicota indica) was found to be the primary reservoir for THAIV. Serological studies have revealed, but not confirmed, other rodents in Thailand as possible reservoirs, including the black rat (Rattus rattus), Polynesian rat (R. exulans), brown rat (R. norvegicus) and lesser rice-field rat (R. losea).

Virology 

Thailand virus (THAIV) is genetically diverse from other hantaviruses. The L, M, and S nucleotide segments reveal its most recent ancestor in common to be the Seoul virus(SEOV). However, four recently isolated THAIV strains from R.Rattus show genetic diversity between themselves and are distinct from SEOV in that they show geographical clustering. This is a distinct feature of all hantaviruses, except for SEOV. The SEOV strains have been primarily isolated from R. norvegicus.

See also 
 Hantavirus hemorrhagic fever with renal syndrome

References

External links 
 CDC's Hantavirus Technical Information Index page
 Viralzone: Hantavirus
 Virus Pathogen Database and Analysis Resource (ViPR): Bunyaviridae
 Occurrences and deaths in North and South America

Hantaviridae
Zoonoses